Amanhã É Tarde (Portuguese for Tomorrow's Too Late) is the fifth studio album by Brazilian band Fellini. It was released on March 4, 2002, by independent carioca label Midsummer Madness. It is their first album of new material since 1990's Amor Louco. Although it is labeled as a Fellini album, it doesn't feature Jair Marcos and Ricardo Salvagni; as it happened in their 1986 album Fellini Só Vive 2 Vezes, it only features Cadão Volpato and Thomas Pappon.

The album's style is a mix between Fellini Só Vive 2 Vezes and Amor Louco: the instrumentation is minimalist, as in 2 Vezes, but light-hearted, varied and reminiscent of MPB, as in Amor Louco — the track "Besouro" even features a berimbau.

It is their last studio album, but not their last release; this would be the 2010 compilation Você Nem Imagina.

Track listing

Personnel
 Fellini
 Cadão Volpato — lead vocals (on all tracks, except 9), backing vocals (on track 9)
 Thomas Pappon — all instruments, backing vocals, lead vocals (on track 9)

 Miscellaneous staff
Recorded in 4 channels in Pellatt Road Studio, London, from March to August 2001.
It contains samples of Jacks Wu, Esther & Abi Ofarim, The Ipanemas, Elizeth Cardoso and Ahmed Abdul-Malik, with all due respect and admiration
 Karla Pappon and Cadão Volpato — photography
 Renato Yada — cover
 Signore Volpato — drawing
 Marcos VRS — mastering
 Rodrigo Lariú — production

References

External links
 Amanhã É Tarde at Fellini's official Bandcamp
 Amanhã É Tarde at Deezer
 Amanhã É Tarde at Tratore's official website 
 Fellini at Midsummer Madness 
 Amanhã É Tarde at Discogs
 Amanhã É Tarde at Rate Your Music

2002 albums
Fellini (band) albums
Portuguese-language albums